Vădeni may refer to:

Vădeni, Brăila, a commune in Brăila County, Romania
Vădeni, Soroca, a commune in Soroca District, Moldova
 Vădeni, a village in Cavadinești Commune, Galaţi County, Romania